Potassium dithionite or potassium hydrosulfite is a potassium salt of dithionous acid.

The compound has UN number UN 1929. As a dithionite, it is closely related to sodium dithionite, which is a commonly used reducing agent and bleaching agent.

See also
 List of UN numbers 1901 to 2000

References

Dithionites
Potassium compounds